Alan Mak may refer to:

Alan Mak (director) (born 1968), Hong Kong film director
Alan Mak (politician) (born 1984), British Member of Parliament